Alberta Provincial Highway No. 855 is a highway in the province of Alberta, Canada. It runs south-north from Highway 9 west of Hanna to Highway 55 and Highway 63 in Atmore. It provides access to rural areas, and is gravel at both its south and north ends. At  it is the longest 500-986 series highway in Alberta.

It is also known as Lougheed Avenue in Heisler, 45 Street in Daysland, 54 Street in Holden, Sawchuk Street in Mundare, and 50 Street in Andrew and Smoky Lake.

Major intersections 
Starting from the south end of Highway 855:

References 

855